Aelurillina is a subtribe of jumping spiders. Nearly all species live in the Old World, except Phlegra hentzi.

Genera
Wayne Maddison in 2015 placed the following genera in the subtribe:
Aelurillus Simon, 1884
Asianellus Logunov & Heciak, 1996
Langelurillus Próchniewicz, 1994
Langona Simon, 1901
Mashonarus Wesołowska & Cumming, 2002 – now regarded as a synonym of Stenaelurillus
Microheros Wesołowska & Cumming, 1999 – now regarded as a synonym of Stenaelurillus
Phanuelus Caleb & Mathai, 2015
Phlegra Simon, 1876
Proszynskiana Logunov, 1996
Rafalus Prószyński, 1999
Stenaelurillus Simon, 1886

References

Salticidae